Bab Biduiyeh (also Romanized as Bāb Bīdū’īyeh and Bāb-e Bīdū’īyeh; also known as Bād Bīdū’īyeh, Dar Bīdū, and Dar-i-Bīdu) is a village in Golzar Rural District, in the Central District of Bardsir County, Kerman Province, Iran. At the 2006 census, its population was 159, in 36 families.

References 

Populated places in Bardsir County